{| 
|+MV Benson Ford|}Benson Ford was a lake freighter built for hauling raw material to Ford Motor Company's River Rouge manufacturing plant in Dearborn, Michigan.  She was named for Benson Ford Sr., grandson of Henry Ford.

 History 

Rather than being powered by coal fired steam propulsion engines like most ships of the day were, the two Ford ships were had 3000 horsepower Sun Doxford diesel propulsion engines and electrically powered systems. They also had luxurious passenger accommodations for Henry Ford and his guests.

In order to an efficient carrier in the ore, and coal trades, Benson Ford'' constructed with large box holds.

References 

Great Lakes freighters
Merchant ships of the United States
1924 ships
Ford Motor Company
Ships built in Ecorse, Michigan